Francesco Boschi (1619–1675) was an Italian painter of the Baroque period, active mainly in Florence. He was the  pupil of his father, Fabrizio Boschi as well as his uncle, the painter Matteo Rosselli. Born in Florence. He was noted for portraits. He painted the portrait of Galileo now in the Louvre.

References

1619 births
1675 deaths
17th-century Italian painters
Italian male painters
Painters from Florence
Italian Baroque painters